Enzo Friso (born 1927) is an Italian former trade union leader.

Born in Padua, Friso became a metal worker and, in 1945, when trade unions were re-legalised, he joined the Italian General Confederation of Labour. In 1954, he began working full-time for the union as its secretary for the Aosta Valley, then in 1960 became its provincial secretary for Pavia. He represented the union at the 1962 Congress of the International Confederation of Free Trade Unions (ICFTU), and soon afterwards began working for the ICFTU as director of its Beirut office. In 1968, he was transferred to Jakarta, then Brussels in 1970. This was the headquarters of the confederation, and Friso became its lead on unions in Latin America.

In 1984, Friso was elected as assistant general secretary of the ICFTU, then in 1992 he became general secretary, but he took early retirement at the end of 1994.

References

1927 births
Living people
General Secretaries of the International Confederation of Free Trade Unions
Italian trade unionists
People from Padua
Italian expatriates in Indonesia
Italian expatriates in Belgium
Italian expatriates in Lebanon